Nicholas Bal (born 2 June 1978) is a former French Nordic combined skier who competed from 1996 to 2007. At the 1998 Winter Olympics in Nagano he won a bronze in the 4 x 5 km team event.

External links
 
 

French male Nordic combined skiers
1978 births
Living people
Nordic combined skiers at the 1998 Winter Olympics
Nordic combined skiers at the 2002 Winter Olympics
Nordic combined skiers at the 2006 Winter Olympics
Olympic Nordic combined skiers of France
Olympic bronze medalists for France
Olympic medalists in Nordic combined
Medalists at the 1998 Winter Olympics